Marcello Spada (1905–1995) was an Italian film actor. He appeared in a dozen films, often in the leading role, between 1928 and 1937. After retiring from cinema he later became a doctor.

Selected filmography
 Kif Tebbi (1928)
 Sun (1929)
 My Childish Father (1930)
 The Table of the Poor (1932)
 Tourist Train (1933)
 The Dance of Time (1936)
 Scipio (1937)

References

Bibliography
 Ruth Ben-Ghiat. Italian Fascism's Empire Cinema. Indiana University Press, 2015.

External links

1905 births
1995 deaths
Italian male film actors
Male actors from Rome
Physicians from Rome
20th-century Italian physicians